Nectocaris is a genus of squid-like animal of controversial affinities known from the Cambrian period. The initial fossils were described from the Burgess Shale of Canada. Other similar remains possibly referrable to the genus are known from the Emu Bay Shale of Australia and Chengjiang Biota of China.

Nectocaris was a free-swimming, predatory or scavenging organism. Two morphs are known: a small morph, about an inch long, and a large morph, anatomically identical but around four times longer.

Nectocaridids have controversial affinities. Some authors have suggested that they represent the earliest known cephalopods. However, their morphology is strongly dissimilar to confirmed early cephalopods, and thus their affinities to cephalopods and even to molluscs more broadly are rejected by most authors. Their affinities to any animal group beyond Bilateria are uncertain, though they have been suggested to be members of Lophotrochozoa.

The closely related Ordovician taxon Nectocotis is a second genus, closely resembling Nectocaris, but suggested to have had an internal skeletal element.

Anatomy 

Nectocaris had a flattened, kite-shaped body with a fleshy fin running along the length of each side. The small head had two stalked eyes, a single pair of tentacles, and a flexible funnel-shaped structure opening out to the underside of the body. The funnel often gets wider away from the head. The funnel has been suggested to represent an eversible (able to be turned inside out) pharynx. Internally, a long cavity runs along the body axis, which is suggested to represent the digestive tract. The body contains a pair of gills; the gills comprise blades emerging from a zig-zag axis. Muscle blocks surrounded the axial cavity, and are now preserved as dark blocks in the lateral body. The fins also show dark blocks, with fine striations superimposed over them. These striations often stand in high relief above the rock surface itself.

Diversity 
Although Nectocaris is known from Canada, China and Australia, in rocks spanning some 20 million years, there does not seem to be much diversity; size excepted, all specimens are anatomically very similar.  Historically, three genera have been erected for nectocaridid taxa from different localities, but these 'species' – Petalilium latus and Vetustovermis planus – likely belong to the same genus or even the same species as N. pteryx. Within N. pteryx, there seem to be two discrete morphs, one large (~10 cm in length), one small (~3 cm long). These perhaps represent separate male and female forms.

Ecology 

The unusual shape of the nectocaridid funnel has led to its interpretation as an eversible proboscis. Martin R Smith has suggested that it was used jet propulsion, though this has been rejected by other authors. The eyes of Nectocaris would have had a similar visual acuity to modern Nautilus (if they lacked a lens) or squid (if they did not). They are thought to have been freely-swimming nektonic organisms, that were either scavengers or predators on soft-bodied animals, using their tentacles to manipulate food items.

Affinity 
The affinity of Nectocaris is controversial. Martin R Smith has suggested that nectocaridids represent highly derived early cephalopods that lost their shell and developed a morphology convergent on modern coleoids. However, most other authors contend that the morphology of nectocaridids is contrary to what is known about cephalopod and mollusc evolution, and they cannot be accommodated within these groups. It has been suggested that a "more likely hypothesis is that Nectocaris represents an independent lineage within the Lophotrochozoa, which developed a mode of life remarkably similar to cephalopods."

History of study

Nectocaris has a long and convoluted history of study. Charles Doolittle Walcott, the discoverer of the Burgess Shale, had photographed the one specimen he had collected in the 1910s, but never had time to investigate it further. As such, it was not until 1976 that Nectocaris was formally described, by Simon Conway Morris.

Because the genus was originally known from a single, incomplete specimen and with no counterpart, Conway Morris was unable to deduce its affinity. It had some features which were reminiscent of arthropods, but these could well have been convergently derived. Its fins were very unlike those of arthropods.

Working from photographs, the Italian palaeontologist Alberto Simonetta believed he could classify Nectocaris within the chordates. He focussed mainly on the tail and fin morphology, interpreting Conway Morris's 'gut' as a notochord – a distinctive chordate feature.

The classification of Nectocaris was revisited in 2010, when Martin Smith and Jean-Bernard Caron described 91 additional specimens, many of them better preserved than the type. These allowed them to reinterpret Nectocaris as a primitive cephalopod, with only 2 tentacles instead of the 8 or 10 limbs of modern cephalopods. The structure previous researchers had identified as an oval carapace or shield behind the eyes was suggested to be a soft funnel, similar to the ones used for propulsion by modern cephalopods. The interpretation would push back the origin of cephalopods by at least 30 million years, much closer to the first appearance of complex animals, in the Cambrian explosion, and implied that – against the widespread expectation – cephalopods evolved from non-mineralized ancestors.

Later independent analyses questioned the cephalopod interpretation, stating that it did not square with the established theory of cephalopod evolution, and that nectocaridids should be considered incertae sedis among Bilateria.

Vetustovermis
Vetustovermis (from Latin: "very old worm") is a soft-bodied middle Cambrian animal, known from a single reported fossil specimen from the South Australian Emu Bay shale.  It is probably a junior synonym of Nectocaris pteryx.

The original description of Vetustovermis hedged its bets regarding classification, but tentatively highlighted some similarities with the annelid worms. It was later considered an arthropod, and in 2010 Smith and Caron, agreeing that Petalilium was at least a close relative of Vetustovermis (but that treating it as a synonym was premature, given the poor preservation of the Vetustovermis type), placed it with Nectocaris in the clade Nectocarididae.

Early press reports misspelled the genus name as Vetustodermis.

Petalilium
Petalilium (sometimes misspelled Petalium) is an enigmatic genus of Cambrian organism known from the Haikou area, from the Maoshoiatan mudstone member of the Chengjiang biota. The taxon is a junior synonym of Nectocaris pteryx.

Fossils of Petalilium show a dorsoventrally flattened body, usually 5 to 6 centimetres, but ranging from 1.5 to 10 cm. It has an ovate trunk region and a large muscular foot, and a head with stalked eyes and a pair of long tentacles. The trunk region possesses about 50 soft, flexible, transverse bars, lateral serialised structures of unknown function. The upper part of the body, interpreted as a mantle, is covered with a random array of spines on the back, while gills project underneath. A complete, tubular gut runs the length of the body.

Whilst it was originally described as a phyllocarid, and a ctenophore affinity has been suggested, neither interpretation is supported by any compelling evidence.

Some of the characters observed in Chen et al.'s (2005) study suggested that Petalilium may be related to Nectocaris.

See also

 Cambrian explosion
 Chengjiang biota
 List of Chengjiang Biota species by phylum

Footnotes

References

Further reading
  – 3D animations are available and a more detailed consideration of Nectocaris

  – Brian Switek discusses the taxonomy and history of Nectocaris in his blog 

  – BBC News coverage of the Smith & Caron's (2010) re-description

  – a blog article supporting Mazurek & Zatoń's (2011) view

External links

Nectocarididae
Burgess Shale animals
Cambrian Series 2 first appearances
Miaolingian extinctions
Maotianshan shales fossils
Prehistoric cephalopod genera
Prehistoric invertebrates of Oceania
Controversial taxa
Fossil taxa described in 1976
Emu Bay Shale
Cambrian genus extinctions